Kakavand-e Sharqi Rural District is a rural district (dehestan) in Kakavand District, Delfan County, Lorestan Province, Iran. At the 2006 census, its population was 8,241, in 1,715 families.  The rural district has 71 villages.

References 

Rural Districts of Lorestan Province
Delfan County